Robert Macdonald is an American politician and the former mayor of Lewiston, Maine. He was first elected in 2011, and reelected in 2013 and 2015.

Macdonald, a Vietnam War veteran and former police detective, made opposition to welfare a centerpiece of his mayoral tenure.

References

See also 

Maine Republicans
Mayors of Lewiston, Maine
Northeastern University alumni
Living people
Politicians from Boston
American police detectives
1947 births